Clásica 650 AM is a state-owned Uruguayan Spanish-language AM radio station that broadcasts from Montevideo.

Its programs are devoted to classical music.

References

External links
 Clásica 650 AM

Spanish-language radio stations
Radio in Uruguay
Classical music radio stations
Mass media in Montevideo
Radiodifusión Nacional del Uruguay